The Argus As 410 was a German air-cooled inverted V-12 light aircraft engine that was first produced by Argus Motoren in 1938.

Design and development
The engine marked a departure from earlier Argus engines in that it had new construction techniques which gave the engine greater operating speeds and power. The engine featured smaller 105 mm x 115 mm cylinders with deep finned steel cooling slots, aluminum heads, geared supercharger, a steel alloy crankshaft and a magnesium alloy crankcase. The engine weighed approximately 315 kg and produced 465 PS (459 hp, 342 kW) at 3,100 rpm. Approximately 28,700 engines were produced.

A distinctive feature is the finned spinner ahead of the propeller. This is driven by the airflow as a windmill, and used to power the actuator of the variable-pitch propeller.

The more powerful and refined Argus As 411 was developed from it.

Applications
Arado Ar 96
Argus Fernfeuer
Focke-Wulf Fw 189 
Henschel Hs 129A
Pilatus P-2
Siebel Si 204

Specifications (Argus 410A)

See also

References

Aircraft air-cooled V piston engines
Argus aircraft engines
1930s aircraft piston engines
Inverted V12 aircraft engines